Megatone is the third studio album by Klaus Schulze's side project, Richard Wahnfried, released in 1984. On this album, Schulze collaborates with Michael Garvens, Axel-Glenn Müller, Ulli Schober, Michael Shrieve and Harald Katzsch.

Track listing

Personnel
Klaus Schulze - synths
Michael Garvens - voice
Axel-Glenn Müller - saxophone
Ulli Schober - drums
Michael Shrieve - percussion
Harald Katzsch - guitar

References

External links
 Megatone at the official site of Klaus Schulze

Klaus Schulze albums
Ambient albums by German artists
Trance albums
1984 albums